The 2024 United States presidential election will be the 60th quadrennial presidential election, scheduled for Tuesday, November 5, 2024. It will be the first presidential election after electoral votes were redistributed during the 2020 census reapportionment cycle. The incumbent, President Joe Biden, stated in January 2022 his intent to run for reelection with Vice President Kamala Harris as his running mate. In November 2022, former president Donald Trump announced his candidacy for president for a second, nonconsecutive term. In the United States, general elections follow caucuses and primary elections held by the major parties to determine their nominees. The winner of the 2024 presidential election is scheduled to be inaugurated on January 20, 2025.

Abortion rights, LGBT rights, and democratic backsliding in the United States are expected to be leading campaign issues; this is the first presidential election to be held in the aftermath of Dobbs v. Jackson Women's Health Organization and the January 6 United States Capitol attack.

Background

Procedure

Article Two of the United States Constitution states that for a person to serve as president, the individual must be a natural-born citizen of the United States, be at least 35 years old, and have been a United States resident for at least 14 years. The Twenty-second Amendment forbids any person from being elected president more than twice. Both incumbent president Biden and former president Donald Trump are eligible to seek reelection. Candidates for the presidency typically seek the nomination of one of the various political parties of the United States, which is awarded through a process such as a primary election. The primary elections are usually indirect elections where voters cast ballots for a slate of party delegates pledged to a particular candidate. The party's delegates then officially nominate a candidate to run on the party's behalf. The presidential nominee typically chooses a vice presidential running mate to form that party's ticket, which is then ratified by the delegates at the party's convention.

Similarly, the general election in November is also an indirect election, in which voters cast ballots for a slate of members of the Electoral College; these electors then directly elect the president and vice president. If no candidate receives the minimum 270 electoral votes needed to win the election, a contingent election will be held in which the House of Representatives will select the president from the three candidates who received the most electoral votes (this last happened in 1825), and the Senate will select the vice president from the candidates who received the two highest totals (this last happened in 1837). The presidential election will occur simultaneously with House of Representatives elections, Senate elections, and various state and local-level elections.

Both Biden and Trump have indicated that they intend to run for president in 2024, suggesting a potential rematch of the 2020 election, which would be the first rematch since the 1956 United States presidential election. If Trump is elected, he would become the first president since Grover Cleveland in 1892 to win a second non-consecutive term.

Effects of the 2020 census

This will be the first U.S. presidential election to occur after the reapportionment of votes in the United States Electoral College following the 2020 United States census. This apportionment of electoral college votes will remain through the 2028 election. Reapportionment will be conducted again after the 2030 United States census.

Potential campaign issues

Abortion rights
Abortion rights are expected to be a leading topic, as this will be the first presidential election to be held in the aftermath of the 2022 Dobbs v. Jackson Women's Health Organization decision, which overturned the 1973 Roe v. Wade decision and permitted U.S. states to fully ban abortion for the first time in nearly 50 years. 

The topic of abortion could play a role in the Republican primary with many potential candidates, such as former vice president Mike Pence, supporting a nationwide ban on the procedure. Other potential candidates have struck a less aggressive tone and suggested that the matter should remain the decision of state governments. Democrats are predominately supportive of its legality to the point of fetal viability.

Democracy and insurrection threats  

Donald Trump did not concede defeat to Joe Biden in the 2020 presidential election, citing unsubstantiated claims of voter fraud, and has continued denying the election results . Republican officials in the Trump administration and in Congress have supported attempts to overturn the election. Concerns have been raised by election security experts that officials who deny the legitimacy of the 2020 presidential election may attempt to impede the voting process or refuse to certify the 2024 election results.

In the 2022 United States elections, the majority of Republican candidates in five battleground states falsely claimed or implied that the 2020 presidential election was illegitimate. Election legitimacy was a major political issue during the 2022 elections, and it is credited for unexpectedly strong Democratic performance that year. Nevertheless, according to the New York Times, by November 9, nearly 200 election deniers had been elected to office.

In August 2022, Ali Alexander, who organized one of the many rallies preceding the January 6 United States Capitol attack, stated that he would be returning to the Capitol building in 2025 "for whatever the Congress certifies."

Economy

The COVID-19 pandemic left behind significant economic effects which could persist into the 2024 presidential election. An October 2022 New York Times/Siena College poll indicated that Americans were most concerned about the state of the economy and the rate of inflation.

LGBT rights

LGBT rights in the United States are expected to be a leading issue of the 2024 presidential campaign. The current composition of the Supreme Court has led to speculation that the conservative majority will vote to overturn the 2015 Obergefell v. Hodges decision, which ruled that marriage was a fundamental right for same-sex couples. In the event of repeal, a majority of states would not legally recognize same-sex marriages.

Democratic Party

President Joe Biden has consistently stated that he plans to run for re-election and keep Vice President Kamala Harris as his running mate. However, he has yet to officially declare his candidacy. During late 2021, as Biden was suffering from low approval ratings, there was speculation that he would not seek re-election, and some prominent Democrats have publicly urged Biden not to run. In addition to Biden's unpopularity, many are concerned about his age; he was the oldest person to assume the office at age 78 and would be 82 at the end of his first term. If re-elected, he would be 86 at the end of his second term. There has also been speculation that Biden may face a primary challenge from a member of the Democratic Party's progressive faction, an opinion that has proven to be vindicated with author, progressive activist and 2020 Biden rival Marianne Williamson declaring a primary challenge in March 2023 before Biden could announce his own intentions. However, Biden's approval rating slowly recovered throughout 2022, climbing from the low 30s to the high 40s. Additionally, after Democrats outperformed expectations in the 2022 midterm elections, many believed the chances that Biden would run for and win his party's nomination had increased.

Declared candidates

Republican Party

Donald Trump was defeated by Biden in 2020 and is currently eligible to run again in 2024. Currently he is seeking to become the second president to serve two non-consecutive terms, after only Grover Cleveland (who did so by winning the 1892 United States presidential election). Trump is considered an early frontrunner for the Republican presidential nomination, following his 2024 campaign announcement on November 15, 2022. However, there are multiple factors working against Trump: the hearings held by the United States House Select Committee on the January 6 Attack have damaged public opinion towards him, and in 2022 the FBI searched Trump's estate at Mar-a-Lago.

Although Florida Governor Ron DeSantis has not officially announced a presidential run, he is often seen as a main contender to Trump for the presidency; DeSantis raised more campaign funds in the first half of 2022, and had more favorable polling numbers than Trump by the end of 2022. Trump announced in March 2022 that if he runs for re-election and wins the Republican presidential nomination, his former vice president Mike Pence will not be his running mate. If Trump runs against President Biden again, it will be the first presidential rematch since 1956 after Dwight D. Eisenhower successfully ran for reelection against Adlai Stevenson II. Trump filed a statement of candidacy with the Federal Election Commission on November 15, 2022, and announced his candidacy in a speech at Mar-a-Lago the same day.

On February 14, 2023, Nikki Haley filed a statement of candidacy with the Federal Election Commission, and on February 15, 2023, in Charleston, South Carolina, officially announced her candidacy, making her the first challenger to former President Donald Trump's campaign.

Declared candidates

Libertarian Party

Declared major candidates

Formed exploratory committee 
 the following individual has announced exploratory committees to look into running for president within the previous six months.

 Chase Oliver, chair of the Atlanta Libertarian Party and nominee for U.S. Senate in Georgia in 2022.

Independents, other third parties, or party unknown

Candidates

Declared intent to run
 the following individuals have declared their intent to run for president.

 Joseph "Afroman" Foreman, rapper
 Kanye West, rapper, candidate for president in 2020 (campaign)

Potential candidates
 Howie Hawkins, environmental activist and candidate for president in 2020 for the Green Party
 Tulsi Gabbard, United States Representative from HI-02 (2013–2021), member of the Honolulu City Council (2011–2012), member of the Hawaii House of Representatives (2002–2004), Democratic candidate for president in 2020

Declined to be candidates
 Mark Cuban, investor and entrepreneur
 Dwayne Johnson, actor and businessman
 Kyrsten Sinema, United States Senator from Arizona (2019–present), United States Representative from AZ-09 (2013–2019), member of the Arizona Senate (2011–2012), member of the Arizona House of Representatives (2005–2011)
 Larry Hogan, Governor of Maryland (2015–2023), Secretary of Appointments of Maryland (2003–2007); founder of Hogan Companies and Change Maryland

General election opinion polling

Timeline

See also

 2024 United States elections
 2024 United States gubernatorial elections
 2024 United States House of Representatives elections
 2024 United States Senate elections

Notes

References

 
United States presidential election, 2024